Kim Chul (born 11 July 1980) is a South Korean field hockey player who competed in the 2008 Summer Olympics.

References

External links

1980 births
Living people
South Korean male field hockey players
Olympic field hockey players of South Korea
Field hockey players at the 2008 Summer Olympics
Asian Games medalists in field hockey
Field hockey players at the 2002 Asian Games
Field hockey players at the 2006 Asian Games
Asian Games gold medalists for South Korea
Medalists at the 2002 Asian Games
Medalists at the 2006 Asian Games
2002 Men's Hockey World Cup players
2006 Men's Hockey World Cup players